Nugroho Fatchur Rochman (born 8 September 1996) is an Indonesian professional footballer who plays as a midfielder for Liga 2 club Persiba Balikpapan.

Club career

PSG Pati
In 2021, Nugroho signed a contract with Indonesian Liga 2 club PSG Pati. He made first 2021–22 Liga 2 debut on 26 September 2021, coming on as a starting player in a 2–0 loss with Persis Solo at the Manahan Stadium, Surakarta.

Persiba Balikpapan (loan)
He was signed for Persiba Balikpapan to play in the second round of Liga 2, on loan from PSG Pati. Nugroho made his debut on 15 December 2021 in a match against Sriwijaya at the Pakansari Stadium, Cibinong.

Honours

Club

Persija Jakarta
 Liga 1: 2018
 Indonesia President's Cup: 2018

References

External links
 Nugroho Fatchur Rochman at Soccerway
 Nugroho Fatchur Rochman at Liga Indonesia

1996 births
Living people
Indonesian footballers
Persija Jakarta players
PSG Pati players
Association football midfielders
Sportspeople from Surabaya